The 1978 Women's British Open Squash Championships was held at Wembley in London from 24 February - 2 March 1978. Heather McKay (née Blundell) announced that she was semi-retired and would not compete in the British Open again after a remarkable run of sixteen consecutive title wins. The 1978 event was won by Sue Newman who defeated Vicky Hoffman in the final.

Seeds

Draw and results

First round

Second round

Third round

Quarter finals

Semi finals

Final

References

Women's British Open Squash Championships
Women's British Open Squash Championship
Women's British Open Squash Championship
Squash competitions in London
Women's British Open Championship
British Open Championship
Women's British Open Squash Championship
Women's British Open Squash Championship